Ankit Babu Adhikari is a musician, singer and lyricist from Kathmandu, known from his appearance as top-8 finalist in Nepali Tara season 3.

Music
Ankit started his musical career by composing and performing songs for a post-modern play Coma; A Political Sex staged at Shilpee Theatre, Kathmandu in 2014. His another major milestone includes his solo concert organised in tribute to Narayan Gopal. In 2014-15 he made it to Nepali Tara after which he gained wider audience throughout Nepal and abroad. His first original release is Ram Naam, a song that questions the physical existence of God; that was critically acclaimed in Nepal. He continued his experiment in a 2016 release Nau Futey Bhoot (9 ft. ghost), a song about Indian Blockade in Nepal, for which the Japan-based magazine The Diplomat named him Nepal's Singing Storyteller.

Dr Govinda K.C Anthem
Ankit has released an anthem for Dr Govinda K.C. while he was in his 11th hunger-strike against Nepal's medical mafia. The song contributed to mass campaigns to his support on social media. The song Ma Govinda Banchu (I will be Govinda) explains what it means to be like Dr. Govinda K.C.

Journalist
He was a journalist with The Kathmandu Post and The Himalayan Times before switching into music. At the age of 19, he started his career as a correspondent covering crime, security, history and human rights. Before coming into music full-time, he was a copy-editor. He is also a co-producer of the critically acclaimed documentary Looking The Un-eyed Way. Produced with Pradeep Bashyal and Kumar Paudel, the documentary featured Deurupa Pandey, a 75-year-old blind woman from a village in the hills of Syangja district, who lived alone creating wonders about herself.

See also
 Bipul Chettri
 Indira Joshi
 Deepak Limbu

References

External links 
 

1991 births
Living people